Kuala Berang Bridge or Jambatan Kuala Berang (Jawi: جمبتن کوالا بيرڠ) is a bridge in Kuala Berang, Terengganu, Malaysia, which crosses Terengganu River.

See also
Federal Route 106

References
http://www.nst.com.my/latest/new-bridge-to-link-two-villages-to-kuala-berang-1.433637

Bridges in Terengganu
Hulu Terengganu District